The 1956 Houston Cougars football team was an American football team that represented the University of Houston in the Missouri Valley Conference (MVC) during the 1956 NCAA University Division football season. In its second and final season under head coach Bill Meek, the team compiled a 7–2–1 record (4–0 against conference opponents) and won the MVC championship. Don Flynn and Ken Wind were the team captains. The team played its home games at Rice Stadium in Houston.

Schedule

References

Houston
Houston Cougars football seasons
Missouri Valley Conference football champion seasons
Houston Cougars football